Samuel Schwarz may refer to:

 Mommie Schwarz (1876–1942), Dutch Jewish painter and graphic artist
 Samuel Schwarz (speed skater) (born 1983), German speed skater
 Samuel Schwarz (politician) (1814–1868), Swiss politician
 Samuel Schwarz (engineer and historian) (1880–1954), Polish-Portuguese mining engineer and historian

See also
Samuel Schwartz (disambiguation)